Patrick, Paddy  or Pat Power may refer to:

 Patrick Power (Canadian politician) (1815–1881), Canadian politician
 Patrick Power (Liberal politician) (died 1835), MP for Waterford
 Patrick Power (lawyer) (born 1952), Australian legal official convicted of possessing child pornography
 Patrick Power (tenor) (born 1947), New Zealand tenor
 Patrick Power (historian) (1862–1951), Irish church historian 
 Patrick Power (East Waterford MP) (1850–1913), Irish politician 
 Paddy Power, an Irish bookmaking chain
 Paddy Power (Irish politician) (1928–2013), Fianna Fáil politician
 Paddy Power (hurler) (1895–?), Tipperary hurler
 Pat Power (born 1942), Australian Roman Catholic bishop
 Pat Power (Victorian politician) (1942–2009), Australian politician

See also
 Patrick Powers (disambiguation)